Enemy of the Music Business is the ninth studio album by the British band Napalm Death, released in 2000. This album, along with Words from the Exit Wound, are the only Napalm Death studio albums that were released only on CD until 2013. London-based Secret Records has re-issued the album on CD (with covers EP Leaders Not Followers included as bonus tracks) and 180g LP. This is the last release that has Jesse Pintado actually performing. Kerrang put it on the list of the best 50 albums of the 2000, at the position number 19.

Track listing

CD Re-issue bonus tracks listing (Leaders Not Followers EP)

Notes
Tracks number 7 and 13 are misspelled as "Cant Play Wont Pay" and "(The Public Get) What The Public Doesn't Want" in the back of the album. "Taste The Poison" is credited as "Take The Poison" in the booklet.

"Fracture in the Equation" lasts 3:46. At the end of the song, there is a long silence block from 3:46 to 9:54 and, after that, a secret soundbite comes fading in of a fan introducing himself, just like in the Leaders Not Followers EP and Order of the Leech.

Personnel

Napalm Death
 Mark "Barney" Greenway – vocals
 Jesse Pintado – lead guitar
 Mitch Harris – rhythm guitar
 Shane Embury – bass
 Danny Herrera – drums

Technical personnel
 Simon Efemey – production
 Russ Russell – production
 Saša Janković – engineering
 Kevin Metcalf – mastering
 MID – cover artwork
 Duncan Bullimore – design, additional artwork

References

Napalm Death albums
2000 albums
Spitfire Records albums